"One and One (Ain't I Good Enough)" is a song from Australian pop group Wa Wa Nee. The song was released in April 1987 on 2x7" Vinyl Single as the fourth and final single from their self-titled debut studio album, (1986). The song peaked at number 19 on the Australian Kent Music Report.

The group performed the song live on Countdown.

Track listing 
7" (CBS – 650726)
Side A "One and One (Ain't I Good Enough)" – 3:16
Side B "Rubber Cookie" – 4:00
Side C "Mind Over Matter" – 3:30
Side D "Playtime" – 3:10

12"'
Side A "One and One (Ain't I Good Enough)" – 7:00
Side B "Playtime" – 6:10

Charts

References 

1986 songs
1987 singles
Wa Wa Nee songs
Songs written by Paul Gray (songwriter)
CBS Records singles